The men's long jump at the 1954 European Athletics Championships was held in Bern, Switzerland, at Stadion Neufeld on 27 and 28 August 1954.

Medalists

Results

Final
28 August

Qualification
27 August

Participation
According to an unofficial count, 25 athletes from 17 countries participated in the event.

 (2)
 (2)
 (2)
 (1)
 (1)
 (1)
 (1)
 (1)
 (2)
 (2)
 (1)
 (2)
 (1)
 (2)
 (1)
 (2)
 (1)

References

Long jump
Long jump at the European Athletics Championships